Demise is an Anglo-Norman legal term (from  French démettre, from Latin dimittere, to send away) for the transfer of an estate, especially by lease. It has an operative effect in a lease, implying a covenant "for quiet enjoyment."

The phrase "demise of the Crown" is used in English law to signify the immediate transfer of the sovereignty, with all its attributes and prerogatives, to the successor without any interregnum in accordance with the maxim "the Crown never dies." At common law the death of the sovereign eo facto dissolved Parliament, but this was abolished by the Representation of the People Act 1867. Similarly the common law doctrine that all offices held under the Crown were terminated at its demise has been abolished by the Demise of the Crown Act 1901.

Etymology
The English word "demise" comes from the Latin word "demissio" (see, e.g., ex demissione), which comes from Latin "demittere," which is a compound of de + mittere, meaning "to send from".

Through euphemism, "(a person's) demise" is often used as a stilted term for a person's death.  "Demise" can also be used to describe the passing away of some thing, for example: "After 36 years of providing authentic Indian cuisine in Bath, the demise of the Rajpoot restaurant occurred when its owner, Ahmed Chowdhury, retired.  It ceased trading on 24 December 2016".

Notes

References

Attribution

Legal terminology